Franklin is a local government area in the southernmost part of New Zealand's Auckland Region, governed by the Franklin Local Board and Auckland Council. It currently aligns with the council's Franklin Ward.

Pukekohe is the largest settlement of the area and the seat of the local board.

The predecessor to Franklin was the Franklin District.

Geography

The area spans from the Hauraki Gulf in the east to the Manukau Harbour and Tasman Sea in the west. The forests of the Hunua Ranges and the southern and western shores of the Manukau Harbour provide a habitat for a range of wildlife, including birds.

Franklin includes the townships of Pukekohe, Waiuku and Beachlands, as well as Awhitu Peninsula, Karaka, Ardmore, Clevedon, Whitford, Maraetai, Kawakawa Bay and Orere Point.

Econoomy

The area is predominantly rural, with an economy based around horticulture and agriculture. The community is also known for the Clevedon Farmers' Market, horse breeding, and motorsports.

Infrastructure

State Highway 1 and the North Island Main Trunk Railway run through Franklin, with Pukekohe being the last stop for Auckland's commuter train network. The water reservoirs in the Hunua Ranges are one of Auckland's main sources of water. Other critical gas, water, electricity and telecommunications infrastructure also pass through Franklin.

References